The Carbery Junior A Football Championship (known for sponsorship reasons as the Bandon Co-op Carbery Junior A Football Championship) is an annual club Gaelic football competition organised by the Carbery Board of the Gaelic Athletic Association and contested by junior-ranked teams in West Cork, Ireland, deciding the competition winners through a group and knockout format.

Introduced in 1926 as the West Cork Junior Football Championship, it was initially a straight knockout tournament. The competition went through a number of format changes since then, including the introduction of a back-door or second chance for beaten teams. The competition took on its current format in 2022, adding a round-robin group stage and limiting the number of entrants.

In its present format, the 16 teams are drawn into four groups of four teams and play each other in a single round-robin system. The four group winners and four group runners-up proceed to the knockout phase that culminates with the final. The winner of the Carbery Junior A Championship, as well as being presented with the Mick McCarthy Cup, qualifies for the subsequent Cork Junior A Football Championship.

The title has been won at least once by 21 different clubs. The all-time record-holders are Bandon, who have won a total of 16 titles. 

St. James' are the title-holders after defeating Argideen Rangers by 0-11 to 0-05 in the 2022 championship final.

Format

Overview

The West Cork Junior Championship is effectively a knockout tournament with pairings drawn at random — there are no seeds.

Each match is played as a single leg. If a match ends as a draw there is a period of extra time. However, if both sides are still level at the end of extra time, a replay takes place and so on, until a winner is found.

Format

Preliminary round: 
Four teams contest this round. An open draw is made to determine the two pairings. The two winning teams advance to the latter stages of the championship. The two losing teams advance directly to Round 1.

Round 1: 
Sixteen teams contest this round. An open draw is made to determine the eight pairings. The eight winning teams of these games advance directly to Round 3. The eight losing teams advance directly to Round 2.

Round 2: 
Eight teams contest this round. An open draw is made to determine the four pairings. The four winning teams of these games advance directly to the quarter-finals. The four losing teams enter the relegation play-offs.

Round 3: 
Eight teams contest this round. An open draw is made to determine the four pairings. The four winning teams of these games advance directly to the quarter-finals. The four losing teams are eliminated from the championship.

Relegation play-offs:
Four teams contest this round. An open draw is made to determine the two pairings. The two losing teams advance to the final. The losing team from that game is relegated from the championship.

Quarter-finals:
Eight teams contest this round. An open draw is made to determine the eight pairings. The four winning teams advance directly to the semi-finals. The four losing teams are eliminated from the championship.

Semi-finals:
Four teams contest this round. An open draw is made to determine the two pairings. The two winning teams advance directly to the final. The two losing teams are eliminated from the championship.

Final:
The final is contested by the two semi-final winners.

Teams

2023 Teams

Trophy and medals

The Mick McCarthy Perpetual Memorial Cup is the current prize for winning the championship. It was commissioned to honour Mick McCarthy who played for O'Donovan Rossa, Carbery, Cork and Munster, and who died from injuries sustained in a road traffic accident on 5 February 1998, at the age of 33. The cup was unveiled in October 1998 and first presented to Eugene Murphy, captain of the Carbery Rangers team which won the 1998 final. The cup replaced the Little Norah Cup which, after being donated by Beamish and Crawford in 1949, was last presented in 1997.

In accordance with GAA rules, the West Cork Board awards a set of medals to the championship winners.

Sponsorship

Roll of Honour

List of finals

Notes:
 1926 - The first match ended in a draw.
 1935 - The first match ended in a draw: Dohenys 2-01, Barley Hill 2-01.
 1938 - The first match ended in a draw: Carbery Rangers 2-02, Enniskeane 2-02.
 1943 - The first match ended in a draw: Rock Rovers 1-06, Carbery Rangers 2-03.
 1945 - The first match ended in a draw: O'Donovan Rossa 1-04, St Mary's 2-01.
 1951 - Bandon won the title after an objection.
 1960 - The first match ended in a draw: Bandon 1-05, Ballinascarthy 2-02.
 1971 - The first match ended in a draw: Bandon 1-08, Bantry Blues 1-08.
 1974 - The first match ended in a draw: O'Donovan Rossa 0-12, Clonakilty 2-06.
 1985 - The first match ended in a draw: Bantry Blues 2-08, Ballinascarthy 1-11.
 1990 - The first match ended in a draw: Newcestown 1-09, Dohenys 2-06.
 1999 - The first match ended in a draw: Ilen Rovers 0-13, Carbery Rangers 1-10.
 2013 - The first match ended in a draw: St Colum's 1-05, Tadhg Mac Cárthaigh 0-08.
 2014 - The first match ended in a draw: St Mary's 1-08, Gabriel Rangers 0-11.
 2018 - The first match ended in a draw: Kilmacabea 0-12, Tadhg Mac Carthaigh's 2-06.

Records

By decade

The most successful team of each decade, judged by number of West Cork Junior Football Championship titles, is as follows:

 1920s: 1 each for Kilbrittain (1926), Dohenys (1927), Bantry Blues (1928) and Bandon (1929)
 1930s: 3 for Carbery Rangers (1937-38-39)
 1940s: 3 for Clann na nGael (1941-43)
 1950s: 4 each for Bandon (1950-51-52-53) and Dohenys (1956-57-58-59)
 1960s: 3 for Dohenys (1962-65-66)
 1970s: 3 for Bandon (1970-71-75)
 1980s: 3 for Carbery Rangers (1980-84-87)
 1990s: 2 each for Carbery Rangers (1991-98), Dohenys (1992-93), Tadhg Mac Cárthaigh's (1995-97) and Ilen Rovers (1996-99)
 2000s: 3 for Tadhg Mac Cárthaigh's (2002-04-06)
 2010s: 2 each for Gabriel Rangers (2010-16), Bandon (2011-15) and Kilmacabea (2017-18)

Successful defending

10 teams of the 21 who have won the championship have successfully defended the title. These are:
 Bandon on 5 occasions (1951, 1952, 1953, 1971 and 2008)
 Dohenys on 5 occasions (1957, 1958, 1959, 1966 and 1993)
 Carbery Rangers on 3 occasions {1938, 1939 and 1940)
 Bantry Blues on 2 occasions (1947 and 1969)
 Ilen Rovers on 2 occasions (2000 and 2001)
 Clonakilty on 1 occasion (1949)
 Enniskean on 1 occasion (1934)
 Clann na nGael on 1 occasion (1942)
 Darrara on 1 occasion (1955)
 Kilmacabea on 1 occasion (2018)

Gaps

Top ten longest gaps between successive championship titles:
 40 years: Carbery Rangers (1940-1980)
 39 years: Clann na nGael (1942-1981)
 28 years: Clonakilty (1949-1977)
 26 years: Dohenys (1966-1992)
 23 years: O'Donovan Rossa (1982-2005)
 22 years: Bantry Blues (1932-1944)
 21 years: Dohenys (1935-1956)
 21 years: Bantry Blues (1947-1968)
 21 years: Newcestown (1967-1988)
 18 years: Bandon (1929-1947)
 18 years: Clonakilty (1930-1948)
 18 years: Bandon (1989-2007)

The Double

Five teams have won the South West Junior Football Championship and the South West Junior Hurling Championship in a single year as part of a Gaelic football-hurling double. Kilbrittain became the first team to win the double in 1926. Bandon are the record holders having claimed the double on four occasions - 1929, 1960, 1971 and 1975. Dohenys are the only club to have won a back-to-back double - 1958 and 1959. Newcestown (1967) and Clonakilty (1977) complete the list of double-winning teams.

Club sides Argideen Rangers, Ballinascarthy and O'Donovan Rossa also hold the distinction of being dual divisional junior championship-winning teams, however, these were not achieved in a single calendar season.

2022 Championship

Group stage 
Group 1

Group 2

Group 3

Group 4

Knockout stage 
Relegation Playoff

 Bandon 2-08 - 1-06  Muintir Bháire

See also
South West Junior A Hurling Championship

References

External links
 Carbery GAA website
 Carbery Junior A Football Finals

West Cork Junior A Football Championship